Adharmam is a 1994 Indian Tamil-language action film directed by Ramesh Balakrishnan. The film stars Murali, Ranjitha and Nassar. It was released on 14 April 1994, Puthandu (Tamil New Year). V. Manikandan debuted as cinematographer from this film.

Plot

Cast 
 Murali as Arjuna
 Ranjitha
 Nassar as Dharma
 Thalaivasal Vijay
 Vadivelu
 V.K.Dhivakaran (VK Sasikala's brother;as inspector)             
 Vijayakumar
 Thalapathi Dinesh
 Ajay Rathnam
 G. M. Sundar
 S. N. Lakshmi
 R. P. Viswam
 Janaki

Music 
The music was composed by Ilaiyaraaja, while the lyrics were written by Vaali and Ilaiyaraaja.

Reception 
The Indian Express wrote, "Adharmam is a promising debut from Ramesh Krishnan. [..] His screenplay is clearly etched, and there is confidence and seriousness in his approach". Thulasi of Kalki wrote this film which deals with the subject of sandalwood abduction completely justifies it which makes us wonder whether Veerappan has financed this film. He also felt there were too many fights and most of them were plagiarized but praised the cinematography.

References

External links 
 

1990s Tamil-language films
1994 directorial debut films
1994 films
Films directed by Ramesh Balakrishnan
Films scored by Ilaiyaraaja